The Chatuzange Treasure is the name of an important Roman silver hoard found in the village of Chatuzange-le-Goubet in the department of Drôme, south-eastern France. Since 1893 it has been part of the British Museum's collection.

Discovery
In the district of La Part-Dieu near Chatuzange-le-Goubet, among the ruins of a large Roman villa, a significant silver hoard was unearthed in 1888.  The treasure, which consists of six pieces of antique dishes, seems to have been buried for safe-keeping, perhaps during the period of local insurrections that occurred at this time in Roman Gaul. It was discovered by the land-owner of the site who subsequently sold the treasure to a Paris art dealer, who in turn sold it to the British Museum in London.

Description
The whole treasure is composed of six pieces of high quality Roman silver that dates from the 2nd and 3rd centuries AD and has a total weight of 5.6 kg. There are two skillets, one of which is decorated with the figure of Felicitas between two rosettes and below her a woman offering a sacrifice at an altar, while the other is adorned with the necks of swans and a basket of fruit. Other items in the treasure include a large fluted washing-bowl with the figures of the Three Graces in the central panel, another fluted dish, a large plate and a small cup, both with a niello inlaid swastika, which was a relatively common symbol in the Roman Empire.

See also
Other Roman silverware treasure :
Chaourse Treasure
Mâcon Treasure
Caubiac Treasure
Berthouville Treasure
Boscoreale Treasure
Rethel Treasure

Gallery

Bibliography
D. Strong, Greek and Roman Silver Plate (British Museum Press, 1966)
L. Burn, The British Museum Book of Greek and Roman Art (British Museum Press, 1991)
S. Walker, Roman Art (British Museum Press, 1991)
Archaeological Society of Drôme (Vol. XXII. Page 340-345).
 K. Painter, Le Tresor de Chatuzange in 'Tresors d'orfevrrerie gallo-romaine' (F. Baratte (ed)), 1989, Paris

References

1888 archaeological discoveries
Archaeological discoveries in Europe
Archaeological discoveries in France
Ancient Greek and Roman objects in the British Museum
Silver objects
Treasure troves of France
Treasure troves of late antiquity